Tartarini is an Italian surname. Notable people with the surname include:

 Alfredo Tartarini (1845–1905), Italian painter
 Corrado Tartarini (died 1602), Italian Roman Catholic bishop

Italian-language surnames